Paul Roy McDonough (December 14, 1916 – August 11, 1960) was a professional American football player who played end for four seasons for the Pittsburgh Pirates and the Cleveland Rams.

References

1916 births
1960 deaths
Players of American football from Salt Lake City
American football ends
Utah Utes football players
Pittsburgh Pirates (football) players
Cleveland Rams players